Corey Scott Feldman (born July 16, 1971) is an American actor and musician. As a youth, he became well known for roles in the 1980s in films such as  Friday the 13th: The Final Chapter (1984), Gremlins (1984), The Goonies (1985), and Stand by Me (1986). In 1987, Feldman co-starred in the horror film The Lost Boys with Corey Haim; they became known as "The Two Coreys"  and went on to appear in other films together, including License to Drive (1988) and Dream a Little Dream (1989).

Feldman experienced diminishing success in the film industry as an adult, amid well-publicized personal conflicts with Haim over the latter's substance abuse and with Michael Jackson, who had befriended him during his time as a teen celebrity. He has been outspoken about sexual abuse of children and teens in the entertainment industry, identifying himself as a victim of such abuse.

Early life
Corey Scott Feldman was born on July 16, 1971, in Reseda, California, the son of record producer Bob Feldman and cocktail waitress Sheila Feldman. He was raised Jewish. Feldman has claimed that his parents exploited him for his earning potential as a child actor, and that his mother was abusive. She has denied his accusations.

Career

Child actor
Feldman started his career at the age of three, appearing in a McDonald's commercial. In his youth, he appeared in over 100 television commercials and on 50 television series, including The Bad News Bears, Mork & Mindy, Eight Is Enough, One Day at a Time,  Madame's Place, and Cheers. He was in the films Time After Time and Disney's The Fox and the Hound. In 1981, he appeared in NBC's musical comedy children's special How to Eat Like a Child alongside other future child stars Billy Jayne and Georg Olden. In 1982, he portrayed "Little Big" Jim Malloy in the single-episode situation comedy Cass Malloy, which served as the pilot for the later sitcom She's the Sheriff.

Teen years
Feldman became known as a teen idol in the 1980s. During the mid-to-late 1980s, he "was known for being one of the most popular teen pin-ups in the world". He was featured in several consecutive high-grossing movies during this period; those movies included Friday the 13th: The Final Chapter (1984), Gremlins (1984), The Goonies (1985), and Stand By Me (1986) as Teddy Duchamp, the latter alongside River Phoenix, Wil Wheaton, and Jerry O'Connell. In 1987, Feldman appeared with Corey Haim in The Lost Boys, in which he played Edgar Frog, a role he reprised in two direct-to-video sequels years later, Lost Boys: The Tribe (2008) and Lost Boys: The Thirst (2010). The Lost Boys marked the first onscreen pairing of Feldman and Haim, who became known as "The Two Coreys". The pair went on to star in a string of films, including License to Drive (1988) and Dream a Little Dream (1989). Feldman also voiced the character of Donatello in the original live action Teenage Mutant Ninja Turtles movie.

Career as an adult
After a public battle with drugs (which began shortly after filming concluded for The 'Burbs in 1989), Feldman fought to re-establish his life and career by working with youths, starring in several lesser-known films, and branching out with an album titled Love Left. He returned to the big screen with Teenage Mutant Ninja Turtles III, once again providing the voice of Donatello, and starred in the Richard Donner/Robert Zemeckis/Joel Silver film Tales From The Crypt Presents: Bordello of Blood opposite Dennis Miller and Angie Everhart.

In 1995, Feldman starred with Haim in their last mainstream film together, Dream a Little Dream 2. In the late 1990s, Feldman starred in the CBS series Dweebs and then released his second album, Still Searching for Soul, with his band, Corey Feldman's Truth Movement. In 1996, Feldman appeared alongside his former Stand By Me co-star Jerry O'Connell in "Electric Twister Acid Test", an episode of the Fox Network series Sliders. In 1999, he appeared as Officer Corey Feldman in the music video for the New Found Glory single "Hit or Miss". In the same year, he made an appearance in the television series The Crow: Stairway to Heaven.

In 2002, Feldman released a solo album, Former Child Actor, and promoted it with a second US tour. In 2003, he appeared in the celebrity-driven reality series The Surreal Life on The WB. He also made a cameo appearance in the film Dickie Roberts: Former Child Star starring David Spade. He appeared in the music video for the Moby single "We Are All Made of Stars". He appeared in the theatrical release My Date with Drew and was the voice of "Sprx-77" in the Toon Disney/ABC Family series Super Robot Monkey Team Hyperforce Go!.

In 2007, Feldman and Haim began a reality television series titled The Two Coreys on the A&E Network. In January 2008, they started production on the second series of The Two Coreys. He was also executive producer for both seasons.

In 2010, Feldman made an appearance in the music video for the single "1983" by Neon Trees. In 2011, he also appeared in the music video for the Katy Perry single "Last Friday Night".

In January 2012, Feldman joined the British television series Dancing on Ice with American pair skater Brooke Castile. In April 2013, Feldman also appeared in the music video for the Mac Miller single "S.D.S.". In October 2013, Feldman appeared in the music video for "City of Angels" by Thirty Seconds to Mars.

On October 28, 2013, Feldman released his first memoir, Coreyography. The book details his early life as a child actor all the way up to the death of Corey Haim. It also discusses his struggles with addiction and as a victim of Hollywood child sexual abuse.

In 2015, Feldman and his then-girlfriend, Courtney Anne Mitchell, appeared in an episode of the fourth season of the reality television series Celebrity Wife Swap. His girlfriend swapped with actor/comedian Tommy Davidson's fiancée, Amanda.

In April 2018, Feldman was honored with a Lifetime Achievement Award at the third annual Young Entertainer Awards.

In October 2019, Feldman appeared in an episode of  Marriage Boot Camp. In September 2020, he filed a lawsuit against We TV and Think Factory Media for emotional abuse, claiming he was held "hostage" on the set. He also claimed that We TV "falsified information to the public, and discredited Mr. Feldman as a liar on their show." and alleged that Marriage Boot Camp "glamorized abuse" and caused "distress". In March 2021, he dropped his lawsuit against We TV. Court records did not indicate whether they reached a settlement.

Corey's Angels 
Corey's Angels is a musical group Feldman created. In September 2016, he made an appearance on the Today program to support his album Angelic 2 the Core, which sparked backlash for its unusual nature. Also in 2016, he stated that he had created a "360 management development and production entity" known as Corey's Angels "to help girls who were kind of lost and needed help to find their way."

Advocacy
Feldman contends that sex abuse of child actors is a widespread problem in show business. On October 25, 2017, in response to the Harvey Weinstein sexual abuse allegations, he started an Indiegogo campaign to finance a film about his life to expose the secret child sexual abuse that he claims is just as common in Hollywood as sexism and sexual assault against adults. In March 2018, he spoke at the New York State Capitol in Albany, New York, in support of the Child Victims Act, which would lengthen the statute of limitations for civil claims arising out of acts of child sex abuse and would create a one-year period in which sex abuse survivors could bring civil claims that were then barred by the statute of limitations.

Feldman is a Democrat and an advocate for animal welfare and animal rights; he has adhered to a vegetarian diet since his youth. He appeared with his wife in a PETA ad campaign promoting vegetarianism. He was awarded the Paws of Fame Award by the Wildlife WayStation for his dedication to animal rights.

Personal life
Feldman stated that he began the "Emancipation Proclamation in Hollywood" at age 15, when he was granted emancipation from his parents. He stated that he was worth $1 million by age 15, and by the time the judge ordered the bank records to come forward, only $40,000 remained.

On March 28, 2018, Feldman claimed that he received a small puncture wound and admitted himself to a hospital. It was later reported by the police that he had no lacerations.

Feldman holds beliefs in the paranormal.

Drug/alcohol abuse 
Feldman has spoken publicly about his struggles with drug addiction and alcoholism, which he said started due to abuse from his mother and his sexual abuse while in the film industry. In September 1990, it was reported that he had been charged with possession of heroin in what was described as his second narcotics-related charge since March 1990. He has said that he underwent a 10-month rehabilitation process to recover from his addiction to heroin. In 2013, he wrote that he had abstained from the use of hard drugs since 1995.

In October 2016, he denied being on drugs when he performed on the Today program the previous month. In October 2017, he was charged with misdemeanor possession of marijuana, driving under suspension, and speeding after being pulled over in Mangham, Louisiana. His security guard and four other members of his group were charged with drug crimes, including possession of Xanax.

Friendship with Corey Haim
Feldman and fellow actor Corey Haim were close friends. Feldman first met Haim at the age of 14 on the set of The Lost Boys, a film in which they both acted. The two "bonded instantly" and became known as "The Two Coreys". The Two Coreys "became the hosts of a weekly underage party night for Hollywood Youth called Alphy's Soda Pop Club".

The Two Coreys went on to star in License to Drive (1988) and Dream a Little Dream (1989) together. Ultimately, the two would appear in a total of nine films together. Becoming a brand, The Two Coreys achieved mainstream fame and notoriety as teen idols. However, both Feldman and Haim experienced career downturns due to drug use.

The Two Coreys, a reality show about The Two Coreys, aired on the A&E Network from 2007 to 2008. The disintegrating relationship between the former best friends prompted a six-month hiatus before the second season. Before Haim's death, he and Feldman reconciled off-camera.

Following a long battle with drug addiction, Haim died of pneumonia in 2010. Following Haim's death, Feldman said that he "hoped his friend would be remembered 'as a beautiful, funny, enigmatic character who brought nothing but life and lights and entertainment and art to all of our lives'".

In 2020, Feldman released My Truth: The Rape of 2 Coreys. The documentary explores the friendship between Feldman and Haim and asserts that both were sexually abused as children in the entertainment industry.

Friendship with Michael Jackson
Feldman was close friends with Michael Jackson, as a child and teenager. In his book Coreyography and several interviews, he wrote and spoke about his positive childhood experiences with Jackson: "Michael Jackson's world, crazy as it sounds, had become my happy place... When I was with Michael, it was like being ten years old again."

In 2001, their friendship ended because Jackson thought, based on erroneous information, that Feldman would negatively portray him in an upcoming book. Feldman claimed that on September 11, 2001, that Jackson helped get Marlon Brando, Elizabeth Taylor and Liza Minnelli out of New York City, but did not help him. He in turn retaliated with the song, "Megalo Man", featuring the lyrics: 'I believed in your words/I believed in your lies/But in September in New York/You left me to die/I love you, Megalo Man.'

In February 2005, Feldman was subpoenaed to testify against Jackson in the singer's child molestation trial. Ultimately, he did not testify. Feldman said, "I started looking at each piece of information, and with that came this sickening realization that there have been many occurrences in my life and in my relationship to Michael that have created a question of doubt". Although he was adamant that Jackson never touched him, Feldman recounted that when he was 13 or 14 years old, Jackson once showed him a book that was "focused on venereal diseases and the genitalia". As an adult, Feldman saw this behavior as inappropriate but he later described the incident as Jackson "just being parental for a boy who had no guidance".

When Jackson died in 2009, Feldman dedicated a Los Angeles hospital concert with his rock band, Truth Movement, to the singer.

In 2013, Feldman spoke out in defense of Jackson in the wake of the sexual molestation accusations made by Wade Robson. He explicitly denied that Michael Jackson had molested children. In 2017, Feldman asserted that efforts were made to frame Jackson in order to bury Feldman's allegations of abuse against others.

After new accusations against Jackson were raised in 2019 by the documentary film Leaving Neverland, Feldman repeated that Jackson had never acted inappropriately towards him and called the documentary "one-sided". Two days later, he changed his stance, saying he could "no longer defend" Jackson and adding, "It comes to a point where as an advocate for victims ...it becomes impossible for me to remain virtuous and not at least consider what's being said." However, in December 2019, Feldman stated in a tweet: "I stand [with] all victims. However that will never negate the times & memories we shared. Those were [our] experiences & while I was a victim of molestation, my time [with] MJ was pure & innocent, & that is the person I choose [to] remember".

Other relationships
Feldman was married to actress Vanessa Marcil from 1989 until 1993.

He met actress and model Susie Sprague in a nightclub in January 2002 and they married on October 30 that year on the final episode of the first season of The Surreal Life. The ceremony was co-officiated by a rabbi and by MC Hammer, an ordained minister. In October 2009, the couple split after seven years of marriage. Later that month, Sprague filed for divorce, citing irreconcilable differences. She sought full custody of their son, Zen Scott Feldman, with Feldman having visitation rights. She also sought spousal support. Feldman sought joint custody and wanted the court to block Sprague's spousal support demand. After a five-year process, the couple's divorce became final in 2014.

On November 22, 2016, Feldman married his long-time girlfriend, Courtney Anne Mitchell. The ceremony was officiated by producer Marklen Kennedy, at Elton John's Fizz champagne lounge at Caesars Palace in Las Vegas.

Sexual abuse allegations made by Feldman
As an adult, Feldman has claimed that he is a survivor of child sexual abuse. According to him, he was molested by a man he first identified only as the alias "Ron Crimson", who worked as an assistant to Feldman's father. Feldman has indicated that "Ron" facilitated his initiation into drug addiction. Feldman later identified that man as actor and former personal assistant Cloyd Jon Grissom. He also accused child agent Marty Weiss and former talent agent and Hollywood underage club owner Alphy Hoffman of having sexually abused him.

During an October 2013 episode of The View while Feldman was promoting his autobiography Coreyography, Barbara Walters said that Feldman was "damaging an entire industry" with his allegations.

In March 2020, in his documentary (My) Truth: The Rape of Two Coreys, Feldman repeated a claim that the actor Charlie Sheen had raped his 13-year-old co-star Corey Haim on the set of the film Lucas. The claim was corroborated by his ex-wife Susie Feldman and his Lost Boys co-star Jamison Newlander. Sheen, through his publicist, denied the allegations, calling them "sick, twisted and outlandish".  Haim's mother Judy had identified a different actor as her son's rapist on The Dr. Oz Show and told Entertainment Tonight that Sheen never raped her son, calling the claims "made up".

Sexual misconduct allegations against Feldman 
In January 2018, it was reported that Feldman was under investigation by police on charges of sexual battery. However, Feldman was cleared of all charges the following month.

In June 2020, Feldman removed himself from the SAG-AFTRA Sexual Harassment Committee. SAG-AFTRA had issued a resolution to remove him from the committee after a number of formal complaints were made. Former members of Corey's Angels who had come forward include: Jacqueline Von Rueden, Poeina Suddarth, Margot Lane, Chantal Knippenburg, Amy Clark, Mara Moon, Jezebel Sweet, and Krystal Khali, who detailed information relating to Feldman's conduct with women. The SAG-AFTRA national board resolution also stated that there had been "formal complaints to law enforcement, including the Los Angeles Police Department" against Feldman, and added that "investigations are currently ongoing into the allegations of sexual harassment".

Filmography

Films

Television

Music video

Video games

Discography
As Corey Feldman
 Love Left (1992)
 Former Child Actor (2002)
 Angelic 2 the Core (2016)
 Love Left 2: Arm Me With Love (2021)

With Corey Feldman's Truth Movement
 Still Searching for Soul (1999)
 Technology Analogy (2010)

Books 
 Coreyography: A Memoir, St. Martin's Press, 2013.

References

External links

 
 
 
 When Young Stars Burn Out MSN Movies

1971 births
Living people
American male child actors
American male film actors
American male television actors
American male voice actors
American memoirists
American people of Belarusian-Jewish descent
American people of Polish-Jewish descent
American people of Romanian-Jewish descent
American people of Russian-Jewish descent
California Democrats
Film producers from California
Jewish American male actors
Male actors from California
Participants in American reality television series
People from Reseda, Los Angeles
Television producers from California
20th-century American male actors
21st-century American male actors
21st-century American Jews
Sexual abuse victim advocates